Uremic pruritus is caused by chronic kidney failure and is the most common internal systemic cause of itching.

Nalfurafine, an orally-administered, centrally-acting κ-opioid receptor agonist, is approved to treat the condition in Japan.

See also 
 Pruritus
 List of cutaneous conditions

References

External links 

Pruritic skin conditions